Distant may refer to:
 Distant (band) is a deathcore band from Europe
 Distant (album), an album by Sarge, or the title track
 Distant (film), the North American title of a Turkish film released as Uzak
 William Lucas Distant (1845–1922), an English entomologist
 Distant signal in railway signalling
 "Distant", a 2018 song by Jaden Smith from The Sunset Tapes: A Cool Tape Story
 Distant, an upcoming film directed by Will Speck and Josh Gordon.